Ventura High School (VHS) is a public high school in Ventura, California. The school is part of the Ventura Unified School District and serves students in the western portion of Ventura and surrounding unincorporated communities including Casitas Springs, Oak View, and La Conchita. VHS is a California Distinguished School.

History
Ventura High School was established in 1889.

In 2012, Sebastien DeClerck, who was a French and Italian language teacher at VHS, was honored as a California Teacher of Year for 2013.

Music
Ventura High's music department has an Instrumental Jazz Ensemble, a Vocal Jazz Ensemble, a Wind Ensemble, Honors Wind Ensemble, a String Orchestra, a Global String Ensemble and a pep-band that is open to all music students and plays at sporting events. The Vocal Jazz Ensemble was added in the 2018–2019 school year, and consists of members of the Instrumental Jazz Ensemble and vocalists from all around the school. Both the Wind Ensemble and String Orchestra have earned distinction nationwide at invitational music festivals Boston, New York, Hawaii, and most recently in 2015 at the NAI Invitational Festival in Chicago in which both groups won first place gold superior in their divisions and String Orchestra won the entire competition.

The Global String Ensemble is both the intermediate level orchestra which performs basic high school string ensemble repertoire as well as traditional Mariachi ensemble repertoire. The department also has an Honors String Quartet chosen every year that has earned distinction nationwide at District, Regional, and State Festivals.
Most recently in the 2014–2015 school year, the school reestablished a Ventura Unified School District Youth Symphony.

Athletics
Ventura High School athletic teams are nicknamed the Cougars. The school competes in the Pacific View League, a CIF Southern Section conference which the school joined in 2018. Prior to this, VHS was a long-time member of the Channel League. The school has 21 teams competing at the varsity level. Ventura's primary rival is Buena High School in east Ventura. As of the 2018–19 academic year, David Hess is the athletic director.

Larrabee Stadium, located on the north end of the campus and overlooking the city, is named for alum Mike Larrabee. The football field within the stadium is named for alum Eric "E-Rock" Turner. The gymnasium is named for former coach Bob Tuttle.

Notable alumni
Chris Beal, CIF champion wrestler; professional mixed martial artist formerly with UFC
Tyler Ebell, football player for UCLA Bruins, UTEP Miners, Edmonton Eskimos, Toronto Argonauts, and BC Lions
Michael Enfield, soccer player, 3-year starter for UCLA, member of Sydney FC
James Ennis, basketball player, small forward for the Miami Heat and Perth Wildcats
Roman Fortin, NFL football player with Detroit Lions, Atlanta Falcons, and San Diego Chargers
Karen Grassle, actress, best known for playing Caroline Ingalls on Little House on the Prairie
Charles R. "Chuck" Imbrecht, member of California State Assembly, 36th district
Brook Jacoby, baseball player, Cleveland Indians
Thomas C. Katsouleas, president of the University of Connecticut
Kyle, rapper
Don Lang, third baseman with St. Louis Cardinals
Mike Larrabee, double gold medalist in track and field at the 1964 Tokyo Olympics
Bill Payne, founding member of band Little Feat; graduated 1967
Chris Thomas, professional football player with San Francisco 49ers, Washington Redskins, St. Louis Rams, and Kansas City Chiefs
Eric Turner, NFL defensive back for Cleveland Browns, Baltimore Ravens, and Oakland Raiders
Jamaal Wilkes, basketball player for UCLA Bruins, Golden State Warriors, and Los Angeles Lakers

References

External links

Buildings and structures in Ventura, California
Educational institutions established in 1889
High schools in Ventura County, California
Public high schools in California
1889 establishments in California